Shaumyan may refer to:
Shaumyan (surname)
Shaumyan, Dashkasan, Azerbaijan
Aşağı Ağcakənd, Azerbaijan - formerly called Shaumyan
Xankəndi, Shamakhi, Azerbaijan - formerly called Shaumyan(abad)
Shaumyan, Russia, several rural localities in Russia